The Tampere Old Church is a wooden cross church opened in 1825 in Tampere, Finland near the Central Square. The old church is mainly used by the Swedish-speaking Lutheran congregation in Tampere. The church was designed by Italian-born Carlo Bassi and completed in 1824. The belfry, designed by C. L. Engel, was completed in 1828. The Old Church is the oldest surviving building in the city center of Tampere, and the adjoining belfry is the second oldest.

The church has been renovated several times, most recently in 2000. The most significant restoration took place between 1953 and 1954, when the church was restored to almost its original appearance according to a restoration plan drawn up by Professor Nils Erik Wickberg. The church is used by the Swedish Congregation of Tampere.

See also
 Helsinki Old Church

References

External links
 Tampereen vanha kirkko - Museovirasto (in Finnish)
 Vanha kirkko - Tampereen seurakunnat (in Finnish)
 Panoraamakuvia Tampereen Vanha Kirkko – VirtualTampere.com (in Finnish)

Buildings and structures in Tampere
Wooden churches in Finland
Churches completed in 1824
Tourist attractions in Tampere
19th-century churches in Finland
19th-century Lutheran churches